Patrick Dennis Heenan (born March 1, 1938) was a former American football cornerback in the National Football League for the Washington Redskins and the Baltimore Colts. He played college football at the University of Notre Dame.  He became one of the only players to begin their collegiate career in the "interhall" league, that is the intramural tackle football league at the University of Notre Dame, and end their career in the NFL.

References

 

1938 births
Living people
Players of American football from Detroit
American football cornerbacks
Notre Dame Fighting Irish football players
Washington Redskins players
University of Detroit Jesuit High School and Academy alumni